Malate is a district of Manila, Philippines. Together with the district of Ermita, it serves as Manila's center for commerce and tourism.

Etymology
The name Malate is believed to be derived from a corruption of the Tagalog word maalat ("salty"). Legends known that when two Spanish soldiers asked a woman about the name of the place, the lady's little brother, tasted salt, shouted "Maalat, Ate!" ("Sister, it is salty!"). The Spanish man misheard it, and used the words as the place's name. However this a common modern Filipino 'folk etymology' mechanism (and commonly employed into many Philippine place name etymologies today) and has no historical basis (eg. the term "ate" was not adopted into Tagalog vernacular from Minnan "achi" until much later into the 19th c).

The actual origin of Malate indeed came from "maalat" but for geographical reasons. Antonio Morga writing in 1609: "Manila has two drives for recreation. One is by land, along the point called Nuestra Señora de Guia. It extends for about a legua along the shore and is very clean and level. Thence it passes through a native street and settlement, called Bagunbayan, to a chapel, much frequented by the devout, called Nuestra Señora de Guia, and continues for a goodly distance further to a monastery and mission-house of the Augustinians, called Mahalat."

Rizal who republished Morga's account, later annotated: "Better, Maalat. The Spaniards pronounced this later Malate. There lived the chief Tagáls after they were deprived of their houses in Manila, among whom were the families of Raja Matanda and Raja Soliman. San Augustín says that even in his day many of the ancient nobility dwelt there, and that they were very urbane and cultured. "The Men hold various positions in Manila, and certain occupations in some of the local public functions. The women make excellent lace, in which they are so skilful that the Dutch women cannot surpass them." This is still true of the women."

Maalat most likely was referring to the brackish waters, where the river estuary (in today's Malate Estero) meets the bay; named most likely used way before arrival of the Spanish.

History

Malate was thought of as the place where the kings/high chiefs of Manila settled after losing their fort "Maynila" (now Intramuros) to the Spanish in 1571. During most of the Spanish colonial period, Malate was an open space with a small fishing village. During the Spanish period, the center of activity was the Malate Church, dedicated to Our Lady of Remedies. It was bordered by Pasay to the south, San Andres Bukid to the east, shores of Manila Bay to the west, Paco to the northeast, Makati to the southeast, and Ermita to the north.

After the United States of America annexed the islands in 1898 as a consequence of the Spanish–American War, American urban planners envisioned the development of Malate as the newest and trendiest exclusive residential area for American families. American expatriates and some of the old Spanish mestizo families populated the district in modern high rise apartments and bungalows. In 1901, with the chartering of the city of Manila, Malate would be absorbed by the city of Manila when its borders were extended outside Intramuros.

Despite extensive damage after the Second World War, many homes and buildings were still standing. The displaced wealthy families who evacuated their homes during the war returned and re-built their private villas and kept the whole district exclusively residential until the 1970s.

The once exclusive residential areas in western Malate began to transform into a commercial area with some large homes and residential apartments being converted into small hotels, specialty restaurants and cafes.

During the presidency of Ferdinand Marcos, visual and performing artists found a haven in Malate and it became a bohemian enclave.

List of Barangays

Accessibility
The district can be directly accessed by the main roads like the Roxas Boulevard, Quirino Avenue and Taft Avenue.

The Light Rail Transit LRT Line 1 (LRT-1) follows Taft Avenue and stops at two stations located in Malate, Vito Cruz and Quirino stations.

Economy

Government offices
Agencies like the Department of Finance (DOF), the Bangko Sentral ng Pilipinas (BSP) and lending institution LandBank of the Philippines are headquartered in the district, whilst the National Naval Command Headquarters of the Philippine Navy is at the boundary limits of Manila and the city of Pasay along Roxas Boulevard. The Bureau of Plant Industry is also headquartered in the district.

The Apostolic Nunciature to the Philippines is located in the district along Taft Avenue near Quirino Avenue. This serves as the residence of the Pope during visits in the country.

Facilities

In the 1990s, Malate and the nearby district of Ermita had been "cleaned-up" and big businesses and resort hotels have sprouted in the district.

Harrison Plaza, Manila's first enclosed modern mall, was located in the Malate district.

There is one public hospital, the Ospital ng Maynila Medical Center, located at the corner of Roxas Boulevard and Quirino Avenue.

Recreation
The district is also home to the Philippine's first sports stadium, the Rizal Memorial Sports Complex and the country's premiere zoological park, the Manila Zoological and Botanical Garden. Promenades and parks by the Manila Bay have been made more convenient and safe with the opening of the Manila Baywalk area and the renovated Plaza Rajah Sulayman. A portion of the Cultural Center of the Philippines Complex also lies within the district.

The district contains a red-light district. A Koreatown could also be found in the district.

Education and scholarly activity

Education in Malate is mostly provided by private schools. Several educational institutions which are part of the University Belt are located in Malate, these are the De La Salle University, De La Salle – College of Saint Benilde, Philippine Christian University, Philippine Women's University, St. Paul University Manila and St. Scholastica's College Manila. Prominent secondary schools in Malate are the Jesus Reigns Christian Academy, Jose Abad Santos Memorial School and the Malate Catholic School. Doña Aurora Quezon Elementary School is the only public school in the district.

Notable residents
Carlos Yulo
Tina Monzon-Palma
Herminio A. Astorga
Piolo Pascual
Inigo Pascual
Michael V.
Kim Atienza

Gallery

Notes
By Sword and Fire: The Destruction of Manila in World War II, 3 February-3 March 1945 by Alphonso J. Aluit (1994) Bookmark, Inc. © 1994 National Commission for Culture and the Arts

References

External links

 
Districts of Manila
Red-light districts in the Philippines